"Lisa's Rival" is the second episode of the sixth season of the American animated television series The Simpsons. It originally aired on the Fox network in the United States on September 11, 1994. Winona Ryder guest stars as Allison Taylor, a new student at Springfield Elementary School. Lisa Simpson begins to feel threatened by Allison because she is smarter, younger, and a better saxophone player. The episode's subplot sees Homer steal a large pile of sugar from a crashed truck and sell it door-to-door.

The episode was written by Mike Scully and directed by Mark Kirkland. "Lisa's Rival" was the first episode written by Scully. The episode was originally pitched by former writer Conan O'Brien, while the subplot was suggested by George Meyer. It features references to films such as The Fugitive and Scarface. Production of the episode was affected by the 1994 Northridge earthquake.

Plot
Lisa feels her status as the top student in her class is threatened when a new and exceptionally intelligent student named Allison arrives at Springfield Elementary. Lisa immediately befriends her since they share many traits, but she soon sees that Allison's gifts far exceed hers and begins to doubt herself. At a band audition, the girls stage a saxophone duel that results in Lisa passing out from overexertion twice over and thinking it was a dream both times. Allison wins the audition, much to Lisa's horror.

Even the kids who used to tease Lisa for being smart started to tease Allison instead. Still wanting to be better friends with her, Lisa visits her house after school but is dismayed at her vast number of awards. She plays a word game with Allison and her father that makes her seem dim-witted. Their rivalry comes to a head during Springfield Elementary's annual diorama competition. Allison constructs a scene from "The Tell-Tale Heart", whereas Lisa exerts great effort to build a better diorama; a scene from Oliver Twist, yet an electric fan blows it from her bedroom window and destroys it.

Bart offers to help Lisa sabotage Allison's entry so she can win the contest. He distracts the teachers and other students to allow Lisa to switch Allison's diorama with one featuring a cow's heart. When Principal Skinner discovers the cow's heart diorama, he humiliates Allison in front of the students and faculty. Overcome by guilt, Lisa retrieves Allison's real diorama from its hiding place under the floor. However, Skinner, unimpressed by both Allison and Lisa's entries, declares Ralph's collection of Star Wars figurines the winner. Lisa apologizes to Allison for sabotaging the contest. They become friends, picking up Ralph after he accidentally trips and breaks his action figures.

Meanwhile, Homer steals hundreds of pounds of sugar he finds at the site of Moleman's truck accident. Homer hatches a scheme to get rich by selling sugar door-to-door. He keeps the sugar piled in his backyard, where he obsessively guards it against thieves. Marge grows annoyed by this and tells him to get rid of the sugar pile at once, pointing out he can't defend it all the time. He refuses and accuses her of trying to sabotage his chances of wealth. Marge fires back that Homer needs to give up the sugar pile because it's not only affecting his sleep, but also his sanity. Soon the sugar attracts bees from a local apiary, where Homer tries to swat them, not aware that they have stings. The beekeepers tracked the swarm to Homer's yard and offer to buy the bees back for $2,000. Before the transaction is completed, the weather changes, and starts to rain, dissolving the sugar. The bees fly away, leaving Homer with no money and sugarless.

In another subplot, Milhouse van Houten becomes the target of an FBI manhunt after Bart submits his picture to America's Most Wanted.

Production

Production of the episode was disrupted by the 1994 Northridge earthquake, which also affected the previous episode "Bart of Darkness". The Film Roman building used by the staff was so badly damaged it had to be condemned. They were relocated to a new building for a year, and much of the animation for the episode was done by people at their own homes. The day after the earthquake, the only staff members who turned up for work were Bill Oakley and Josh Weinstein. Overall production of The Simpsons was disrupted for six months, with a month of production time being lost.

Although written by Mike Scully, the episode's original concept was pitched by Conan O'Brien before he left the show. O'Brien suggested having an episode about a rival for Lisa, but the rest of the episode's storyline was written by Scully and other staff members. It was the first episode Scully wrote for the show, and he would later become showrunner. Winona Ryder guest starred as Allison Taylor. She was a fan of the show and was popular amongst the staff. David Mirkin recalled that more writers came to her recording session than any other. Her character's name was derived from the names of two of Scully's daughters, Allison and Taylor. The subplot was pitched by George Meyer. Homer's sugar diatribe was pitched by Meyer off the top of his head and animated by David Silverman, who specifically asked to animate the scene after listening to Dan Castellaneta's performance.

Cultural references

 Marge is seen reading "Love in the time of Scurvy", which is likely a reference to the romance novel, Love in the Time of Cholera.
 Milhouse's sub-story is a reference to the 1993 film The Fugitive. The film is principally parodied in the scene where Milhouse is at the end of a dam drainpipe and dives into a waterfall when being held at gunpoint by an FBI agent resembling Tommy Lee Jones, who uses the film's famous line "I don't care".
 Homer's "In America" speech while guarding his sugar pile is a direct reference to one of Tony Montana's lines in Scarface, and his line "Oh what a world!" when the sugar melts is the same line used by the Wicked Witch of the West in The Wizard of Oz, when she melts.
 Ralph's diorama contest entry is just original Star Wars action figures: his collection includes Luke Skywalker, Obi-Wan Kenobi, and Chewbacca.
 Lisa's hiding of The Tell-Tale Heart diorama under the gym floorboards is a parody of Edgar Allan Poe's "The Tell-Tale Heart"
 The speech patterns of the beekeeper voiced by Hank Azaria are based on Adam West's portrayal of Batman. 
 Lisa's imagination features her playing in a band with famous musicians Art Garfunkel, John Oates, and Jim Messina as backup.

Reception

Critical reception
In a 2008 article, Entertainment Weekly named Winona Ryder's role as Allison Taylor as one of the sixteen best The Simpsons guest stars, while IGN placed her sixth on their list of the "Top 25 Simpsons Guest Stars". They also highlighted Ralph's "classic" lines: "I bent my Wookiee", and "My cat's breath smells like cat food".

Warren Martyn and Adrian Wood, the authors of the book I Can't Believe It's a Bigger and Better Updated Unofficial Simpsons Guide, stated: "Despite being a Lisa show, it is poor Ralph Wiggum who steals the show with three great irrelevant replies, especially those concerning his cat's breath." They also highlighted "great scenes between the Simpson siblings, especially Bart's idea to conquer Allison using a hose pipe".

Ratings
In its original American broadcast, "Lisa's Rival" finished tied for 23rd place (with Dateline NBC) in the weekly ratings for the week of September 5 to September 11, 1994, with a Nielsen rating of 9.9. It was the second highest rated show on the Fox Network that week.

References

External links

The Simpsons (season 6) episodes
1994 American television episodes
Fictional rivalries